The Western Sydney Airport line, previously known as Sydney Metro Greater West, is a under construction  line of the Sydney Metro. The line will operate between St Marys, where the line will connect to the Main Western railway line, and Badgerys Creek Aerotropolis via Western Sydney Airport. It is intended to provide public transport for the upcoming Western Sydney Airport. The line is expected to start construction in December 2022 and to be completed in late 2026 in time for the opening of the airport.

The line will form Stage 1 of the proposed North South Rail Line, which would see the line extended north to Schofields to connect to the Richmond railway line, and south to the Main Southern railway line at Macarthur.

Alignment

Six stations have been proposed for the line.
St Marys (interchange with T1 Western Line)
Orchard Hills
Luddenham
Airport Business Park
Airport Terminal
Aerotropolis

The Sydney Metro Trains Facility and the Operations Control Centre will be located at Orchard Hills, and services facilities will be located at Claremont Meadows and Bringelly.

The line is proposed to run via twin tunnels between St Marys and Orchard Hills stations and between the Airport Terminal and Aerotropolis stations. Tunnel boring machines were planned to be launched from Orchard Hills and the Airport Business Park. The section from Oran Park to Macarthur in the proposed southern extension would also run via tunnels.

History

Planning
In March 2018, the federal and state governments signed the Western Sydney City Deal and announced the development of stage 1 of the North South Rail Link as part of the deal.
	
Between 2019 and May 2020, the stage 1 of the North-South Link is referred to as "Sydney Metro Greater West" by the Sydney Metro agency. The project update on 1 June 2020 confirmed the name of the line to be "Sydney Metro – Western Sydney Airport".

Prior to June 2020, the only stations proposed were at St Marys, Western Sydney Airport and Aerotropolis. The proposed six stations of Stage 1 were confirmed in June 2020 and the exact locations of the stations were confirmed in September 2020.

In October 2020, the project's Environmental Impact Statement (EIS) was released to the public for exhibition. Since the work would be carried out within the airport boundary, federal planning approval was also required. State planning approval was granted in July 2021, and federal planning approval was granted in September 2021.

Funding
In the 2019-2020 federal budget in April 2019, the federal government announced a contribution of $3.5 billion to deliver stage 1 of the rail link. This funding also includes $50 million towards the business case process for the North-South Rail Link and $61 million for the Elizabeth Drive overpass.

In the 2019–2020 New South Wales state budget in June 2019, the state government announced an investment of $2.0 billion to commence the construction of stage 1 for the next 4 years.

In June 2020, the federal and state governments announced a further $3.5 billion contribution to push the construction date earlier to late 2020. Designs were modified to include an additional six kilometres of tunnelling. As of June 2020, the project has a price tag of 11 billion.

Construction
In March 2021, three consortia have been shortlisted to deliver tunnelling works for the project:
 Acciona
 John Holland Gamuda joint venture
 CPB and Ghella

The station box and tunnelling contract was awarded to CPB and Ghella in December 2021. The first of 4 tunnel boring machines is expected to be in the ground in early 2023. Tunnelling is expected to be complete in late 2024, with track laying and station fitout to occur afterwards.

A second major contract for surface and civil alignment works was awarded to CPB and United Infrastructure in March 2022.

A third major contract was the Stations, Systems, Trains, Operations and Maintenance (SSTOM) package for the construction of the stations and operation of the line. In October 2021, three consortia were shortlisted:
Bradfield Metro, comprising John Laing, Keolis Downer, FCC Construction Australia and Hitachi Rail STS
Parklife Metro, comprising Plenary Group, Webuild, RATP Dev and four Siemens Mobility companies
WestGo, comprising CIMIC Group (Pacific Partnerships, CPB, UGL Engineering and UGL Rail), two Acciona companies, DIF Management Australia, ComfortDelGro Transit and Coleman Rail Pty Ltd

The SSTOM package was awarded to Parklife Metro in December 2022.

Operator
Being awarded the SSTOM package, Parklife Metro will operate and maintain the line for 15 years after it becomes operational.

References

External links
Sydney Metro – Western Sydney Airport – Project Overview
North South Rail Line and South West Rail Link Extension - Transport for NSW
North South Rail Line and South West Rail Link Extension - Transport for NSW Corridor Projects
Project's Environmental Impact Statement (EIS) - Major Projects Portal

Proposed railway lines in Australia
Sydney Metro
2026 in rail transport